Antônio Augusto Du Pin Calmon (born October 29, 1945) is a Brazilian telenovela writer.

Career
Beginning of his professional career took place in cinema, as director of short films and assistant direction in seminal films of the so-called Cinema Novo (New Cinema), then conducted the Brazilian film Paranoia (1975), with screenplay by Carlos Heitor Cony, a tense police drama and suspense, on television wrote the serial-TV Armação Ilimitada, attraction displayed by Globo TV between 1985 until 1988. His debut as the author was in 1989, when he wrote along with Walther Negro the novel Top Model, which addressed topics among others such as masturbation and pregnancy in adolescence, was a phenomenon of audience in Brazilian TV.

References

External links

1945 births
Living people
Authors of Brazilian telenovelas
Brazilian male writers
Male television writers